Pelitözü is a quarter of the city Bilecik, Bilecik District, Bilecik Province, Turkey. Its population is 2,225 (2021).

References

Populated places in Bilecik District